David Miller (born December 10, 1964) is an American harness racing driver and trainer. Miller is one of North America's most successful drivers and was elected in the Harness Racing Museum & Hall of Fame in 2014. Among horses he has driven is Always B Miki, Magician, No Pan Intended, Won The West, Poof She's Gone and Gimpanzee.

Career 
David Miller was born December 10, 1964 in Columbus, Ohio. He grew up in Reynoldsburg, Ohio in a harness racing family - his father, grandfather, uncle, nephew and cousin were all drivers. Miller saw his first Little Brown Jug when he was 12 years old.

Miller guided No Pan Intended to the Pacing Triple Crown in 2003. He has won a number of Triple Crown races and Breeders Crown trophies. Miller is a five-time winner of the Little Brown Jug and one of only two drivers (Billy Haughton in 1974) to capture both the Jug and the Jugette in the same year.

On May 3, 2014 at the Meadowlands, Miller reached the 11,000 career victory milestone, becoming only the 8th North American driver to do so.

During 2014, Miller also made his first appearance at Solvalla Racetrack in Stockholm, Sweden, in an elimination for the Elitlopp with world champion trotter Uncle Peter.

List of notable victories

References 

1964 births
Living people
American horse trainers
Dan Patch Award winners
United States Harness Racing Hall of Fame inductees
Harness racing in the United States
People from Columbus, Ohio